Acianthera johannensis is a species of orchid.

johannensis
Plants described in 1881